Munzer Mark Kabbara (born 3 September 2002) is a Lebanese swimmer. He competed in the men's 200 metre individual medley at the 2020 Summer Olympics. He represented Lebanon at the 2022 World Aquatics Championships held in Budapest, Hungary. He swims collegiately for the Texas A&M Aggies.

References

2002 births
Living people
Lebanese male swimmers
Olympic swimmers of Lebanon
Swimmers at the 2020 Summer Olympics
People from Cypress, Texas
American people of Lebanese descent
Texas A&M Aggies men's swimmers
Sportspeople from Houston
Swimmers from Texas
Sportspeople of Lebanese descent